Coca-Cola Consolidated, Inc., headquartered in Charlotte, North Carolina, is the largest independent Coca-Cola bottler in the United States.

The company makes, sells and distributes Coca-Cola products along with other beverages, distributing to a market of 65 million people in 14 states. Coca-Cola Consolidated is based in the southeast, midwest, and mid-atlantic portion of the United States. The Company has 13 manufacturing facilities, 80 distribution and warehouses, with corporate offices located in Charlotte, North Carolina.

Corporate history
In 1902, the company that later became Coca-Cola Bottling Company Consolidated was founded by the current chairman's great-grandfather, J. B. Harrison. That company was merged with other bottlers to form Coca-Cola Bottling Co. Consolidated in 1973. The company was incorporated in 1980, acquired Wometco in 1985, and acquired Sunbelt Coca-Cola in 1991.

In 2018, the company announced a major expansion into Kentucky.

Discontinuation of Tab
In October 2018, Coca-Cola Bottling Consolidated denied it had discontinued distribution of Tab, though it admitted it had reduced its distribution.

Financials

As of January 1, 2017, The Coca-Cola Company owns approximately 35% of the Company's total outstanding common stock, representing approximately 5% of the total voting power of the Company's combined Common Stock and Class B Common Stock. J. Frank Harrison III, the Chairman of the Board and the Chief Executive Officer of the Company, owns shares of Common Stock and Class B Common Stock representing approximately 86% of the total voting power of the Company's combined stock and Class B Common Stock.

Tax Incentives
In June 2018, Kentucky governor Matt Bevin announced tax incentives of $3.5 million for Consolidated to expand in Erlanger. The incentives were part of a deal for Consolidated expansion in the area.

Worker strife
The company, some of which its locales are unionized by the Teamsters, has seen strike initiatives.

Community involvement
Coca-Cola Consolidated sponsors local events and many community organizations, including the YMCA. Since 2008, Coca-Cola Consolidated has partnered with the World Wildlife Fund (WWF) to promote sustainable water policies, including water reuse practices, to protect and restore aquatic diversity.  Following the October 2015 North American storm complex Consolidated donated bottled water to flood victims. It also supports public school teachers in Arkansas.

References

External links

Coca-Cola bottlers
Companies based in Charlotte, North Carolina
Companies based in Greensboro, North Carolina
American companies established in 1902
Food and drink companies established in 1902
Companies listed on the Nasdaq
Drink companies of the United States